The Northwest League is a Minor League Baseball league that operates in the Northwestern United States and Western Canada. A Class A Short Season league for most of its history, the league was promoted to High-A as part of Major League Baseball's 2021 reorganization of the minor leagues. The league operated as the High-A West in 2021, then resumed its original moniker in 2022.

History
The Northwest League (or the Northwestern League) has existed in various forms since 1890, and has been in its current incarnation since 1955. The current NWL is the descendant of the Western International League (WIL), a Class B league from 1937 to 1951 (with a stoppage during World War II) and Class A from 1952 to 1954. The league reformed as the Northwest League and dropped to Class B for the 1955 season. The WIL had ten teams in its final season, with four in Canada. 

In 1955, the Northwest League was formed, with seven charter teams: Salem Senators, Eugene Emeralds, Yakima Bears, Spokane Indians, Tri-City Braves, Wenatchee Chiefs, and Lewiston Broncs. The Northwest League switched to the short season schedule in 1966. Between 1966 and 1982 the league fluctuated between four, six, and eight clubs. In 1983, the league returned to an eight team circuit, which it maintained through the 2019 season.

The start of the 2020 season was postponed due to the COVID-19 pandemic before ultimately being cancelled on June 30. As part of Major League Baseball's 2021 reorganization of the minor leagues, the Northwest League was promoted to High-A, reduced to six teams, and renamed the "High-A West" for the 2021 season. The two dropped teams were the Boise Hawks and Salem-Keizer Volcanoes. Following MLB's acquisition of the rights to the names of the historical minor leagues, the High-A West was renamed the Northwest League effective with the 2022 season.

Current teams

Champions

League champions have been determined by different means since the Northwest League's formation in 1955. Except for 1956, 1960, and from 1966 to 1973, all seasons have ended with playoffs to determine a league champion.

The Eugene Emeralds, Spokane Indians, Yakima Bears have each won 8 championships, the most among all teams in the league, followed by the Boise Hawks (6).

Northwest League teams (1955–present)

 
Bellingham Dodgers: 1973–1976
Bellingham Mariners: 1977–1994
Bellingham Giants: 1995–1996
Bend Rainbows: 1970–1971
Bend Timber Hawks: 1978
Bend Phillies: 1981–1986
Bend Bucks: 1987–1991
Bend Rockies: 1992–1994
Blue Mountain Bears: 1983
Boise A's: 1975–1976
Boise Buckskins: 1978
Boise Hawks: 1987–2020
Central Oregon Phillies: 1979–1980
Coos Bay-North Bend A's: 1970–1973
Eugene Emeralds: 1955–1968; 1974–present
Everett AquaSox: 1995–present
Everett Giants: 1984–1994
Grays Harbor Loggers: 1977–1978; 1980
Grays Harbor Mets: 1979
Grays Harbor Ports: 1976
Hillsboro Hops: 2013–present
Lewiston Broncs: 1955–1974
Medford Giants: 1967–1968
Medford Dodgers: 1970–1971
Medford A's: 1979–1987 
New Westminster Frasers: 1974
Portland Mavericks: 1973–1977
Portland Rockies: 1995–2000
Rogue Valley Dodgers: 1969

Salem-Keizer Volcanoes: 1997–2020
Salem Senators: 1955–1960; 1977–1981
Salem Dodgers: 1961–1965
Salem Dodgers: 1988–1989
Salem Angels: 1982–1987
Seattle Rainiers: 1972–1976
Southern Oregon A's: 1988–1995
Southern Oregon Timberjacks: 1996–1999
Spokane Indians: 1955–1956; 1972; 1983–present
Tri-Cities Triplets: 1983–1986
Tri-City A's: 1969
Tri-City Angels: 1963–1964
Tri-City Atoms: 1961; 1965–1968
Tri-City Braves: 1955–1960
Tri-City Dust Devils: 2001–present
Tri-City Padres: 1970–1972
Tri-City Ports: 1974
Tri-City Triplets: 1973
Vancouver Canadians: 2000–present
Victoria Mussels: 1978–1979
Victoria Blues: 1980
Walla Walla Bears: 1969
Walla Walla Phillies: 1970–1971
Walla Walla Islanders: 1972
Walla Walla Padres: 1973–1982
Wenatchee Chiefs: 1955–1965
Yakima Bears (original): 1955–1964
Yakima Bears: 1990–2012
Yakima Valley Braves: 1965–1966

Cities that have hosted NWL teams

British Columbia
New Westminster: 1974 (1 season)
Vancouver: 2000–2021 (22 seasons)
Victoria: 1978–1980 (3 seasons)

Idaho
Boise: 1975–1976, 1978, 1987–2020 (34 seasons)
Lewiston: 1955–1974 (20 seasons)

Oregon
Bend: 1970–1971, 1978–1994 (19 seasons)
North Bend: 1970–1972 (3 seasons)
Eugene: 1955–1968, 1974–2021 (60 seasons)
Hillsboro: 2013– (8 seasons)
Keizer: (Shared with Salem) 1997-2020 (23 seasons)
Medford: 1967–1971, 1979–1999 (26 seasons)
Portland: 1973–1977, 1995–2000 (11 seasons)
Salem: 1955–1965, 1977–1989, (shared with Keizer) 1997–2020 (45 seasons)

Washington
Aberdeen: 1976–1980 (5 seasons)
Bellingham: 1973–1996 (24 seasons)
Everett: 1984–2021 (35 seasons)
Seattle: 1972–1976 (5 seasons)
Spokane: 1955–1956, 1972, 1983–2021 (39 seasons)
Tri-Cities: 1955–1974, 1983–1986, 2001–2021 (42 seasons)
Walla Walla: 1969–1983 (15 seasons)
Wenatchee: 1955–1965 (11 seasons)
Yakima: 1955–1966, 1990–2012 (35 seasons)

Eugene is the most-tenured city in the NWL, having fielded a team in all but five of the NWL's seasons (from 1969–73, they had a PCL franchise).

Hall of Fame alumni
Eight alumni of the Northwest League are enshrined in the Baseball Hall of Fame:
Bobby Cox - Salem Dodgers, 1961–62; inducted in 2014
Ken Griffey Jr. – Bellingham Mariners, 1987; inducted in 2016
Tony Gwynn – Walla Walla Padres, 1981; inducted in 2007
Rickey Henderson – Boise A's, 1976; inducted in 2009
Reggie Jackson – Lewiston Broncs, 1966; inducted in 1993
Edgar Martínez – Bellingham Mariners, 1983; inducted in 2019
Mike Piazza – Salem Dodgers, 1989; inducted in 2016
Ozzie Smith – Walla Walla Padres, 1977; inducted in 2002

Notable alumni

Sandy Alomar Jr. – Spokane Indians, 1984
Garret Anderson – Boise Hawks, 1990
Kevin Appier – Eugene Emeralds, 1987
Pedro Astacio – Yakima Bears, 1990
Garrett Atkins – Portland Rockies, 2000
Jim Bouton – Portland Mavericks, 1973 & 1977
Jason Bartlett – Eugene Emeralds, 2001
Glenn Beckert - Wenatchee Chiefs, 1963
Dante Bichette – Salem Angels, 1984
Carlos Beltrán – Spokane Indians, 1996
Dallas Braden – Vancouver Canadians, 2004
Kris Bryant - Boise Hawks, 2013
Bert Campaneris - Lewiston Broncs, 1963
Tom Candiotti - Victoria Mussels, 1979
José Canseco – Medford A's, 1983
Rico Carty - Yakima Valley Braves, 1962
Ron Cey - Tri-City Atoms, 1968
Aaron Cook – Portland Rockies, 1998
Ron Coomer - Medford A's, 1987
Chris Davis - Spokane Indians, 2006
Eric Davis – Eugene Emeralds, 1980–81
Mark DeRosa – Eugene Emeralds, 1996
Dick Dietz – Eugene Emeralds, 1962
Josh Donaldson - Boise Hawks, 2007
Dave Duncan - Lewiston Broncs, 1965
Andre Ethier – Vancouver Canadians, 2003
Todd Field – Portland Mavericks batboy, 1976–77
Chone Figgins – Portland Rockies, 1998
Chuck Finley – Salem Angels, 1985
George Foster – Medford Giants, 1968
Matt Franco – Portland Mavericks batboy, 1977
Julio Franco – Central Oregon Phillies, 1979
Tom Gordon – Eugene Emeralds, 1987
Jason Giambi – Southern Oregon A's, 1992
Carlos González – Yakima Bears, 2004
Khalil Greene – Eugene Emeralds, 2002
Pedro Guerrero – Bellingham Dodgers, 1974
Bob Hamelin – Eugene Emeralds, 1988
Dave Henderson - Bellingham Mariners, 1977
Félix Hernández – Everett AquaSox, 2003
Ken Hubbs- Wenatchee Chiefs, 1961
Ender Inciarte - Yakima Bears, 2010
Ian Kinsler -- Spokane Indians, 2003
John Kruk – Walla Walla Padres, 1981
Paul Konerko – Yakima Bears, 1994
Adam Jones – Everett AquaSox, 2003
John Lackey – Boise Hawks, 1999
Mark Langston - Bellingham Mariners, 1981
Ted Lilly - Yakima Bears, 1996
Tim Lincecum – Salem-Keizer Volcanoes, 2006
Kirk McCaskill – Salem Angels, 1982
Denis Menke - Yakima Valley Braves, 1960
Wade Miley - Yakima Bears, 2008
Rick Monday – Lewiston Broncos, 1965
Bill Murray – Grays Harbor Loggers, 1978
Joe Nathan – Bellingham Giants, 1995; Salem-Keizer Volcanoes, 1997
Claude Osteen - Wenatchee Chiefs, 1958
Troy Percival – Boise Hawks, 1991
Eduardo Pérez – Boise Hawks, 1991
Juan Pierre – Portland Rockies, 1998
Kevin Pillar - Vancouver Canadians, 2011
Buster Posey – Salem-Keizer Volcanoes, 2008
Mark Reynolds - Yakima Bears, 2004
Francisco Rodríguez – Boise Hawks, 1999
Kurt Russell – Bend Rainbows, Walla Walla Islanders, Portland Mavericks, 1971–73, 1977
Tim Salmon – Bend Bucks, 1989
Jeff Samardzija – Boise Hawks, 2006
Casey Sander – Seattle Rainiers, 1975
Pablo Sandoval – Salem-Keizer Volcanoes, 2005
Kyle Schwarber - Boise Hawks, 2014
Mike Scioscia – Bellingham Dodgers, 1976
Braden Shipley - Hillsboro Hops, 2014
Ted Sizemore - Tri-City Atoms, 1966
Marcus Stroman - Vancouver Canadians, 2012
Kurt Suzuki – Vancouver Canadians, 2004
Noah Syndergaard - Vancouver Canadians, 2011
Dansby Swanson - Hillsboro Hops, 2015
Mike Sweeney – Eugene Emeralds, 1992–93
Nick Swisher – Vancouver Canadians, 2002
Kevin Tapani - Medford A's, 1986
Miguel Tejada – Southern Oregon A's, 1995
Tom Treblehorn - Bend Rainbows, 1970
Trea Turner - Eugene Emeralds, 2014
Dan Uggla – Yakima Bears, 2001
Max Venable - Bellingham Dodgers, 1976
Shane Victorino – Yakima Bears, 2000
Omar Vizquel - Bellingham Mariners, 1985
Matt Williams - Everett Giants, 1986
Mitch Williams - Walla Walla Padres, 1982
Russell Wilson – Tri-City Dust Devils, 2010
Mike Zunino – Everett AquaSox, 2012

See also
Northwest League Most Valuable Player Award
Sports league attendances

References

External links

 
 Statistics from Baseball-Reference

 
1955 establishments in the United States
Baseball leagues in Oregon
Baseball leagues in Idaho
Baseball leagues in Washington (state)
Minor baseball leagues in the United States